Bat flies are members of the insect order Diptera, the true flies, which are external parasites of bats. Two families of flies are exclusively bat flies: Nycteribiidae and Streblidae. Bat flies have a cosmopolitan distribution, meaning that they are found around the world. Nycteribiidae and Streblidae are members of the superfamily Hippoboscoidea, along with the families Hippoboscidae and Glossinidae.

References

Hippoboscoidea
Insect common names
Parasites of bats